Vassilis Spanoulis (also commonly known as Bill Spanoulis or Billy Spanoulis, ; born 7 August 1982) is a Greek former professional basketball player and current professional basketball coach for Peristeri Athens of the Greek Basket League and the FIBA Champions League. Spanoulis spent the majority of his playing career in the Greek Basket League, winning four Greek League titles as a member of Panathinaikos Athens, and three Greek titles as a member of Olympiacos Piraeus. He also won three EuroLeague titles, one with the former club (2009), and two consecutive (2012 and 2013) with the latter. HoopsHype named Spanoulis one of the 75 Greatest International Players Ever in 2021. In 2022, he was named a EuroLeague Legend. He was also inducted into the Greek Basket League Hall of Fame in 2022.

He earned a record eight All-EuroLeague Team selections and was voted the EuroLeague's 2010–2020 Player of the Decade. He is also the EuroLeague's all-time career leader in total points scored.

Spanoulis first played pro club basketball with Gymnastikos S. Larissas, and enjoyed a highly successful career start. His skill-set earned him a transfer to Athens and Maroussi, where he won the Greek Basket League's Best Young Player award for the 2002–03 season. Following an impressive 2004–05 season, during which he helped lead Maroussi to the Greek Basket League's finals and the 2005 EuroCup quarterfinals, he moved to Panathinaikos, where he became one of European basketball's major stars. In the 2005–06 EuroLeague season, Spanoulis made his debut in impressive fashion, earning his first All-EuroLeague Team selection as a rookie in the competition. After a stint in the NBA with the Houston Rockets during the 2006–07 season, he returned to Panathinaikos and helped lead them to a EuroLeague title in 2009, being voted the EuroLeague Final Four MVP in the process.

Spanoulis' transfer to Olympiacos from Panathinaikos in the summer of 2010 marked a new step in his career, given Olympiacos' feisty rivalry with Panathinaikos. Within a young and rebuilding Olympiacos team, Spanoulis not only led the club to a EuroLeague title run in 2012, but he also went on to lead the team to a historical EuroLeague championship repeat in 2013. In the process, he gained another two EuroLeague Final Four MVP awards, thus joining Toni Kukoč as the only players in the history of European basketball to achieve that distinction on three occasions. Under his leadership, Olympiacos reached another two EuroLeague Finals, in 2015 and 2017.

In 2017, European basketball historian Vladimir Stanković, named Spanoulis the "Most Clutch Player in EuroLeague History". In 2020, Spanoulis was named the "Best EuroLeague Player of The 2010s Decade" by the readers of the website Eurohoops.net.

Spanoulis played an instrumental role on the gold medal win of the Greece men's national basketball team at 2005 EuroBasket. He was one of the main stars of Greece's 2006 FIBA World Cup silver medal team, scoring 22 points in the memorable victory over Team USA (101–95), in the tournament's semifinals. It was however, Greece's bronze medal at the 2009 EuroBasket, that emphasized Spanoulis' leadership within an injury-plagued Greece national team, and consequently earned him an All-EuroBasket Team honor. In 2020, Spanoulis was voted one of the 25 Best Players in Summer Olympics history, since the inclusion of NBA players in 1992, and one of the 5 Best Players of the FIBA EuroBasket, since the year 2000.

Early life and youth career
Spanoulis was born in Larissa, Greece, on 7 August 1982. His father Thanasis Spanoulis, was the owner of a drug store, and his mother Georgia Spanouli, was a bank clerk. Spanoulis was the couple's second and last child, being born three years after his older brother Dimitris.

At the age of 7, Spanoulis began training in the sports of football, swimming, and basketball. As a youth, Spanoulis idolized the basketball players Michael Jordan and Nikos Galis. In 1994, at the age of 12, Spanoulis joined the youth basketball program of the multi-sports club Gymnastikos S. Larissas. Spanoulis' father Thanasis, died of cancer, on 4 November 1997, when Spanoulis was 15 years old.

In 1999, at the age of 16, Spanoulis won the 1998–99 season's national under-18 club championship of Greece. He led Keravnos Larissa, the youth basketball subsidiary of Gymnastikos S. Larissas, to the title of the Panhellenic Youth Championship. He was the championship's leading scorer, and Most Valuable Player. In the competition's semifinals, he scored 40 points against the youth team of Aris Thessaloniki. In the competition's final, he led his team to a 64–61 victory over the youth team of Olympiacos Piraeus. He hit the game-winning 3-point shot, to win the title, at the buzzer.

In 2000, at the age of 17, Spanoulis won the silver medal at the Albert Schweitzer Under-18 World Tournament, and the bronze medal at the 2000 FIBA Europe Under-18 Championship. In 2002, at the age of 19, Spanoulis won the gold medal at the 2002 FIBA Europe Under-20 Championship, in which he made the game-winning free-throws.

Professional career

Gymnastikos S. Larissas
Spanoulis played with the youth teams of Gymnastikos and its subsidiary Keravnos, in Larissa, in the Greek junior levels, from 1994 to 1999. He made his professional debut in the year 1999, at the age of 17, with the senior club of Gymnastikos S. Larissas. In the two seasons of 1999–00 and 2000–01, he played in the 2nd-tier level Greek 2nd Division, with Gymnastikos.

Maroussi Athens
After playing with Gymnastikos S. Larissas, in the Greek 2nd Division, Spanoulis signed a four-year contract with Maroussi of the top-tier level Greek Basket League, the European-wide 3rd-tier level FIBA Korać Cup, and later, the European-wide 2nd-tier level EuroCup. He played with Maroussi until 2005.

2001–02 season
During the 2001–02 season, Spanoulis helped to lead Maroussi to the Greek Cup Final. This was the first time the team had ever made it to the Greek Cup title game. Maroussi also competed in the European-wide 3rd-tier level FIBA Korać Cup 2001–02 season.

2002–03 season
Spanoulis was voted the Greek Basket League's Best Young Player, of the 2002–03 season.

2003–04 season
In the 2003–04 season, Spanoulis helped to lead Maroussi to the Greek Basket League Finals. He also helped lead Maroussi to the 2003–04 season's FIBA Europe League (later called FIBA EuroChallenge) Final. In the FIBA Europe League, Spanoulis averaged 10.8 points per game, and 6.4 assists per game, off the bench for Maroussi. He also shot 40% from three-point range. He was also named the Greek League Most Improved Player that same season.

Spanoulis was then drafted in the 2nd round, of the 2004 NBA draft, by the Dallas Mavericks, following this sudden emergence.  He also made it onto the Greece men's national basketball team, at the 2004 Athens Summer Olympic Games.

2004–05 season
In the Greek Basket League 2004–05 season, his last season with Maroussi, Spanoulis averaged 15.9 points per game, and shot 37.8% from 3-point range, in 35 games played in the Greek Basket League competition.  He then averaged 15.2 points per game, and shot 40.0% from 3-point range, in 12 games of play, in the European-wide 2nd-tier level EuroCup's 2004–05 season.  For the year in total, Spanoulis averaged 15.7 points per game, and shot 38.3% from 3-point range, in 47 games played with Maroussi.  He played in the 2005 Greek League All-Star Game, and was named to the Greek Basket League's Best Five Team. This was a breakthrough year for Vassilis, as he had averaged 11.1 points per game the previous season.  He was considered to be one of the most improved players in Europe for the year.  He helped to lead Maroussi to the 2nd place of the Greek Basket League, for the regular season. At the end of the year, Spanoulis was voted the European 6th Man of the Year, and Rookie of the Year in the EuroCup.
He started being called, "The Greek Steve Nash", by some European fans, after this season.

Panathinaikos Athens

2005–06 season
Following his outstanding season in 2004–05 with Maroussi, Spanoulis signed a 3-year contract worth €1.6 million net income, with EuroLeague powerhouse Panathinaikos Athens. Spanoulis and his agent, Miško Ražnatović, set the contract terms so that Spanoulis would have a buyout clause after just one year, and set the buyout amount at US $400,000. This was Spanoulis' first season playing at the highest European-wide professional club level.

With Panathinaikos, in the Greek Basket League 2005–06 season, he won both the Greek Basket League championship and the Greek Cup. His team went 24–2 during the Greek Basket League regular season, and 8–0 during the Greek League playoffs, for an overall record of 32–2 in the national domestic league championship, and also went undefeated in the Greek Cup, at 5–0, for an overall record of 37–2 in Greek competitions. He played in the 2006 Greek League All-Star Game, and was named to the Greek Basket League's Best Five Team.

Spanoulis was also selected to the EuroLeague 2005–06 season's All-EuroLeague Second Team.

In 28.8 minutes per game of play, during the 2005–06 EuroLeague competition, Spanoulis averaged 14.6 points, 3.1 assists, 2.0 rebounds, and 1.4 steals, in 23 games of EuroLeague play, with Panathinaikos Athens for the season. He also shot 61.8% in 2-point shooting, and 36.8% from 3-point range; 53.4% overall.

He was the team's leading scorer, even though he often came off the bench. He won the EuroLeague MVP of the Round award twice during the season. In 2005–06, his team finished the EuroLeague with a record of 16–7. Spanoulis was also voted as the 7th best worldwide European player of the year (including NBA players) in 2006, by FIBA Europe, in their FIBA Europe Player of the Year award voting.

Many fans in Europe began calling him, "Euro Kobe", after such a dominant rookie season of EuroLeague.

Houston Rockets
On July 19, 2006, Spanoulis opted out of the final two years of his contract with Panathinaikos Athens, and signed a three-year deal (2 years guaranteed) with the NBA's Houston Rockets, who paid for his contract buyout from Panathinaikos. The contract was worth $5.832 million. His buyout from Panathinaikos was $400,000.

The contract amount was for an average of $1.944 million per season.  The Rockets had acquired the rights to Spanoulis on draft night (June 24, 2004), when Houston swapped draft pick #55 Luis Flores, and cash considerations of $300,000 with the Dallas Mavericks, for Spanoulis (pick #50).

"He's a very versatile ball handler," Rockets [then] general manager, Carroll Dawson, said. "He's a good finisher and a very good prospect. He wants to be a great player. Everybody is going to like this young man because he is a very hard-nosed player. We have watched his progress very closely," Dawson said. "It's a big adjustment to come to the NBA from Europe, but he is a hard worker."

Rockets [then] Director of Player Personnel, Dennis Lindsey, stated the following about Spanoulis prior to the team signing him. "We're very, very happy with his progress," said Lindsey. "He changed clubs this year from Maroussi to the bigger club this year, Panathinaikos. For those not familiar with European basketball, they are like the New York Yankees of Greece and one of the two or three better organizations in Europe. They are an NBA level club. From our standpoint, we really like what Vassilis has done. He is their leading scorer. They are 9–1 in the EuroLeague and they have already qualified for the top sixteen."

Lindsey praised Spanoulis' offensive ability. "He's got a couple of characteristics that we like," added Lindsey. "He can really drive and get the ball in the paint, and he's relentless with it. He kind of plays basketball like a fullback a little bit, where he just kind of breaks through the line and there's contact on a lot of plays."

"The owner and Jeff and Carroll really like what they've seen so far and we've made a couple of trips over and hopefully in the near future we can have him as a Rocket because we think he can help us."

2006–07 NBA season

Spanoulis saw limited playing time with the Houston Rockets during his rookie NBA year in 2006–07, averaging 2.7 points and 0.9 assists in 8.8 minutes per game, on 31.9% field goal shooting (17.2% from behind the 3-point line), in 31 games played off the bench.

During Spanoulis' first NBA season there was a dispute between him and Rockets head coach, Jeff Van Gundy, over playing time. There was an issue between the team's management, Spanoulis, and the coach as well, over the contract that Spanoulis had signed. In order to sign with the Rockets, and fulfill his dreams of playing in the NBA, Spanoulis took a considerably smaller contract than the one that was being offered to him by his Greek team, Panathinaikos Athens. He still had two years under his contract with Panathinaikos, but his buyout was small, and could be paid by the Rockets.

Spanoulis agreed to play for Houston at a price of $1.944 million gross income per season, for 3 years, passing up on his former team Panathinaikos's much larger offer of €1.6 million net income per season, over 3 years, just for a chance of playing in the NBA. Spanoulis made the Rockets' rotation, but there was a falling out between him and Rockets coach Van Gundy, after Van Gundy benched Spanoulis, after the coach claimed that he had played poorly, citing that rookie players are dangerous for coaches that are in contract years, and that Spanoulis was too turnover prone and lacking in outside shooting touch to be a good fit in Van Gundy's offensive system design. Said Van Gundy about the situation: "(Spanoulis) says, 'I was [Tracy] McGrady back home.' Great. McGrady is McGrady here," .. "I feel badly for him. He feels he was misled. Frankly, he's been his own worst enemy in many ways. Some of it is excuses. His turnovers have been high; his fouls have been high; his shooting percentage has been low. I would rather anybody start out with self-evaluation—what can I do better?—versus lash out and blame. Because I'm not playing him now doesn't mean he won't play in the future or we don't feel he could be a good player. I think he's allowed his disappointment to go to discouragement, which has, at times, stunted his improvement. We'll see. We'll see."

Spanoulis was traded by the Rockets to the San Antonio Spurs, on July 12, 2007, along with a 2009 second-round draft pick, in exchange for center Jackie Butler, and the rights to Argentinian power forward Luis Scola. On August 19, 2007, the Spurs released Spanoulis, giving him the chance to return to Greece to play for Panathinaikos as he had requested. This was officially announced on August 23, 2007.

Reportedly due to "family reasons," Spanoulis decided that he would not remain in the NBA, with his agent going as far as comparing the Rockets' reluctance to break his contract to slavery. Spanoulis, instead opted to return to Panathinaikos, to once again play in the Greek Basket League and the EuroLeague.

In June 2013, Spanoulis claimed that Van Gundy told him on the first day he arrived at Houston that since he was a rookie, and unfamiliar to Van Gundy, he would be benched for the season. Spanoulis also claimed that the Rockets' next head coach, Rick Adelman, wanted to keep him, and also that both Tony Parker and Gregg Popovich of the San Antonio Spurs were interested in having him on their team.

In November 2015, the General Manager of the San Antonio Spurs, R.C. Buford, confirmed to the Greek press that the Spurs made the trade for Spanoulis with the intention of keeping him and having him play on their team. Buford also confirmed that it was Spanoulis' choice to not play with the Spurs, and to return to play in Greece.

Back to Panathinaikos Athens

2007–08 season
On August 19, 2007, Spanoulis was released by the San Antonio Spurs, after deciding he wanted to play in Greece during the 2007–08 season.  This was due to the fact that his mother was in poor health, and that Spanoulis wanted to be near her.  Spanoulis signed a 3-year contract with Panathinaikos, the then defending EuroLeague champions.  He was signed to play both point guard and shooting guard, along with fellow Greece men's national basketball team star, Dimitris Diamantidis. Former NBA player, Šarūnas Jasikevičius, would later join them in the team's guard rotation.

The contract Spanoulis signed was for 3-years, at €5.5 million net income salary, plus a $1,166,400 contract buyout from his NBA San Antonio Spurs contract (Panathinaikos paid the buyout, so it did not count against the Spurs' salary cap). Spanoulis' agent set up the contract so that Spanoulis could opt out of it after one year.  Spanoulis originally stated that, after the first year of his contract, he might opt out of it and return to San Antonio to play in the NBA again.

During the 2007–08 season, Spanoulis led his team, Panathinaikos, in both points scored (661) and assists (215), over 36 games played in the Greek Basket League 2007–08 season, and 20 games played in the EuroLeague 2007–08 season. He averaged 11.8 points per game and 3.8 assists per game for the season, in 56 games total. Spanoulis was the Greek Basket League assists leader. He was voted as a starter to the Greek League All-Star Game, and to the Greek Basket League's Best Five Team.

Spanoulis helped Panathinaikos win the Greek basketball double, as the club won both the Greek Basket League championship, and the Greek Cup title in 2008. In the Greek Cup Final, against Panathinaikos' arch-rival Olympiacos, Spanoulis helped to lead his team to the championship cup victory, by scoring 20 points and dishing out 7 assists.

2008–09 season
In 2009, Spanoulis led Panathinaikos to the coveted Triple Crown title, as they won the EuroLeague 2008–09 season's championship, the Greek League 2008–09 season's championship, and the 2009 Greek Cup title, all in the same club season. During the 2008–09 club season, Spanoulis was named to the All-EuroLeague Team, and he was also named the EuroLeague Final Four MVP. In addition to that, he was named to the Greek Basket League Best Five, and he was also named the 2009 Greek League MVP. 

After the 2008–09 club season, Spanoulis finished the year of 2009, by leading the senior Greek national team to the bronze medal at the 2009 EuroBasket, where he was also named to the EuroBasket All-Tournament Team. Due to all of his accomplishments and achievements, Spanoulis won the highly prestigious and coveted BTA Balkan Athlete of the Year, which is an award that is given to the calendar year's best athlete that has citizenship in one of the twelve nations of the Balkans region. Spanoulis is the only basketball player to ever win the award.

2009–10 season
Spanoulis won the Greek League's 2009–10 season championship, with Panathinaikos.

Olympiacos Piraeus

2010–11 season
In July 2010, after much speculation concerning his free agency and his next contract, Spanoulis signed a three-year contract with the Greek Basket League club Olympiacos Piraeus, worth  gross income, or  net income (€2.4 million net income per season), plus team performance bonuses. In his first year with Olympiacos, Spanoulis won the Greek Cup, was named to the EuroLeague's All Second Team, and was the Greek Basket League assists leader.

2011–12 season
In 2012, Spanoulis won both the 2012 EuroLeague and Greek Basket League championships. He was also named to the All-EuroLeague First Team, and won the EuroLeague Final Four MVP, for the second time in his career. He became the fourth player to win the award multiple times. Furthermore, he once again led the Greek League in assists. He was also named the Greek Basket League MVP, and the Greek Basket League Finals MVP. Finally, Spanoulis was named the All-Europe Player of the Year in 2012.

2012–13 season
Spanoulis was named the EuroLeague MVP in 2013. He was also the EuroLeague Finals Top Scorer, and was named the EuroLeague Final Four MVP, after leading Olympiacos to the 2013 EuroLeague championship. He became just the second player to win both the EuroLeague MVP and the EuroLeague Final Four MVP in the same season, along with Dimitris Diamantidis; and he also became just the second player to win the EuroLeague Final Four MVP award 3 times, along with Toni Kukoč.

Spanoulis also won the Giuseppe Sciacca International Award for Sport, an award given by the Vatican to the World's Best Athlete of the Year, between the ages of 18 to 35, in 2013. He was also named the All-Europe Player of the Year, for the second time, in 2013.

2013–14 season
Spanoulis signed a 3-year contract extension, worth  net income (€2 million net income per season), plus team performance bonuses, with Olympiacos in July 2013. With Olympiacos, he won the 2013 edition of the FIBA Intercontinental Cup, being named the MVP of the tournament.  In May 2014, he was named to the All-EuroLeague Team, for the sixth time in his career.

2014–15 season
In May 2015, Spanoulis was chosen to the All-EuroLeague First Team, for his performance during the season, his seventh All-EuroLeague Team honour. He led Olympiacos to the 2015 EuroLeague Final, and he also won the 2014–15 season's Greek League championship with Olympiacos, and was voted the MVP of the league's finals.

2015–16 season
Spanoulis won the 2015–16 season's Greek League championship. In game 2 of the 2015–16 Greek League Finals, against Olympiacos' arch-rivals, Panathinaikos, Spanoulis hit a game-winning buzzer-beating 3 pointer. In game 3 of the Greek League Finals, he scored 11 points in the last 3 minutes and 1 second of the 4th quarter, to seal the victory for his team. In game 4 of the Greek League Finals, held at Nikos Galis Olympic Indoor Hall, Olympiacos won in the game's second overtime period, after Spanoulis hit another game-winning 3 point field goal, with 1.9 seconds remaining in the game. He was subsequently named the 2016 Greek League MVP, and the 2016 Greek League Finals MVP.

2016–17 season
In June 2016, Spanoulis signed a new 2-year contract extension with Olympiacos, lasting through the 2017–18 season. The contract was worth  net income (€1.5 million net income per season). During that season's EuroLeague competition, Euroleague.net named Spanoulis the "Most Clutch Player in EuroLeague History". That same season, Spanoulis eventually led Olympiacos to the 2017 EuroLeague Final.

2017–18 season
During the 2017–18 season, Spanoulis became the EuroLeague's all-time career leader in assists, and the Greek Professional Basket League's all-time career leader in points scored. He was also the 2018 Greek Cup Finals Top Scorer. In May 2018, he was named to the All-EuroLeague Second Team, of the 2017–18 season, the eighth All-EuroLeague Team selection of his career, which set a record for the most All-EuroLeague Team selections of all time.

2018–19 season
Prior to the start of the 2018–19 season, Spanoulis signed a one-year contract extension with Olympiacos, on July 2, 2018, at a salary of €1.2 million net income. He was named the MVP of Round 14 of the 2018–19 EuroLeague season.

During the Greek Basket League 2018–19 season, Spanoulis became the Professional Greek League's all-time career assists leader. He passed the previous record holder, Dimitris Diamantidis, in a Greek League game against AEK Athens, in January 2019. On 14 March 2019, Spanoulis suffered a season-ending peroneal tendon rupture on his right ankle, in a EuroLeague game against the Italian club Olimpia Milano.

2019–20 season
After undergoing a 2018–19 season-ending right ankle surgery, for a peroneal tendon rupture, on 1 April 2019, Spanoulis began individual workouts again on 5 July 2019. After his return to individual training, Spanoulis signed a one-year contract extension with Olympiacos, at a salary of €600,000 net income. On 29 November 2019, Spanoulis passed Juan Carlos Navarro, to become the EuroLeague's all-time career leader in Performance Index Rating (PIR). He accomplished the milestone in a EuroLeague 2019–20 season game versus the Italian club Olimpia Milano.

On 2 January 2020, Spanoulis also passed Navarro as the EuroLeague's all-time leading scorer since the 2000–01 season, in Olympiacos' loss against Fenerbahçe. On 4 February 2020, Spanoulis again suffered a season-ending peroneal tendon rupture injury, in a EuroLeague game against Žalgiris Kaunas. It was the same right foot injury, that he had suffered in the previous 2018–19 season. On 7 February 2020, Spanoulis had another surgery to repair the tendon.

On 12 May 2020, Spanoulis was named to the EuroLeague 2010–20 All-Decade Team. Among the 10 players voted onto the All-Decade Team, Spanoulis was voted the number one EuroLeague player of the 2010–2020 decade, in a vote decided by EuroLeague head coaches, EuroLeague players, fans, and sports journalists. He received more than twice as many votes as the player who came in second place in the voting, which was Bogdan Bogdanović.

2020–21 season
On July 11, 2020, Spanoulis re-signed with Olympiacos, to a one-year €600,000 net income contract, through the 2020–21 season. On 10 December 2020, in a game against Red Star Belgrade, Spanoulis passed Juan Carlos Navarro, to become the all-time leading scorer in the history of Europe's top-tier level basketball competition, including all the history of the competition, under both the management of both FIBA and EuroLeague Basketball, dating back to the original FIBA European Champions Cup competition, in 1958. 

Spanoulis announced his intention to retire from playing professional club basketball on 26 June 2021. On 27 September 2021, he held a press conference, in which he officially announced his retirement from the sport.

National team career

Greek junior national team
Spanoulis was a key member of the Greek under-18 junior national team at the FIBA Europe Under-18 Championship's 2000 tournament. Greece finished in third place in the tournament, winning the bronze medal. He averaged 10.1 points per game at the tournament. Spanoulis also played at the 2000 edition of the Albert Schweitzer Under-18 World Tournament, where he averaged 14.0 points per game, and won the silver medal with Greece.

Spanoulis was also on the Greek under-20 junior national team that finished in first place, and thus won the gold medal, at the 2002 FIBA Europe Under-20 Championship. During the 2002 FIBA Europe Under-20 championship's gold medal game, Spanoulis sank two clutch free throws, with just 13 seconds remaining on the game clock. That allowed Greece to clinch the win over the Spain under-20 national team, and win the tournament's gold medal. Spanoulis averaged 16.0 points per game at the tournament.

Greece national team
 
Spanoulis played with Greece's national men's under-26 selection at the 2001 Mediterranean Games. Spanoulis was a key member of the team for Greece during that tournament. Greece finished in second place in the tournament, winning the silver medal.
Spanoulis won a gold medal with the Greece men's national basketball team, at the 2006 FIBA Stanković World Cup tournament. On the way to that achievement, Greece defeated Australia, and then Germany (the later whose team included NBA star Dirk Nowitzki).

Spanoulis was named the MVP, of both the 2007 and 2009 friendly Acropolis Tournaments, in Athens, and he also won the same tournament 9 times with the Greece national team, in the years 2004, 2005, 2006, 2007, 2008, 2009, 2010, 2013, and 2015.

Spanoulis' retirement from the Greece men's national basketball team was announced on September 17, 2015, after the 2015 EuroBasket. He ended his Greece men's national basketball team career, having been the leading scorer in every major tournament that he played in, from 2006 onward (9 tournaments in total: 2006 FIBA World Cup, 2007 EuroBasket, 2008 FIBA World Olympic Qualifying Tournament, 2008 Summer Olympics, 2009 EuroBasket, 2010 FIBA World Cup, 2012 FIBA World Olympic Qualifying Tournament, 2013 EuroBasket, and the 2015 EuroBasket).

In December 2019, Greece's senior national team head coach at the time, Rick Pitino, stated that, "Just for the record, I would love to see Spanoulis join our national team”. Pitino then stated in May 2020, on Spanoulis rejoining the Greece national team, "I must say that I still want Spanoulis to play. Before the injury, I thought that Spanoulis would play. I want him to be the leader, I want him to lead the team, even if he is not 100% ready. He will have time to get back on his feet. I want him to come as a leader. We will not win with athleticism, but with intelligence and the pride of playing for Greece. Spanoulis is very important to me, I want to have him with me. I will make him an offer that he can't refuse."

In his career, Spanoulis had 146 official caps with the senior men's Greek national team, in which he scored a total of 1,494 points, for a scoring average of 10.2 points per game. In all official games played with Greece's men's national team, he had a total of 211 caps, in which he scored a total of 2,314 points, for a scoring average of 11.0 points per game. Spanoulis finished his national team career with Greece, having won a total of nine medals at all levels, seven of which came in FIBA competitions.

Summer Olympic Games
Spanoulis made his debut with the Greece men's national basketball team, for the first time, in the summer of 2004, when he was selected by his then head coach at Maroussi, Greek basketball legend, Panagiotis Giannakis, to be a member of the Greek squad during the 2004 Summer Olympics, which were held in Athens, Greece. Spanoulis was able to play in front of his home country's fans at Helliniko Olympic Arena, as Greece was the Olympic Game's host country. Greece finished in 5th place in the tournament, losing to Manu Ginóbili and the eventual gold medal-winning Argentine national basketball team, 69–64, in the quarterfinals. That was tied for the 2nd highest finish for Greece, in Summer Olympics Basketball, in its history. The 5th-place finish, making Greece one of the top 5 national teams in the world, was the beginning of Greece's great run in international tournaments during the 2000s (decade).

Spanoulis averaged a team-leading 12.8 points per game, at the 2008 FIBA World Olympic Qualifying Tournament, where Greece finished in first place. He also played at the main 2008 Summer Olympics competition, where he led Greece in scoring average at 14.3 points per game, and at the 2012 FIBA World Olympic Qualifying Tournament, where he again led Greece in scoring, with an average of 19.3 points per game, which was the third highest scoring average in the tournament.

On 3 June 2021, Spanoulis' return to once again play with the senior Greek national team at the 2020 FIBA World Olympics Qualification Tournament, after a 6 year hiatus from the team was announced. However, on 26 June 2021, Spanoulis announced his retirement from the sport for good, after he suffered an injury during Greece's training camp preparation.

FIBA EuroBasket
At the 2005 EuroBasket, Spanoulis was a key member of the Greek team that won the EuroBasket and took home the gold medal. It was just the second time in Greece's history, that the senior men's national basketball team won the gold medal at the EuroBasket, and the first time since the 1987 EuroBasket, when the legendary players Nikos Galis, Panagiotis Fasoulas, Fanis Christodoulou, and Panagiotis Giannakis, led Greece's national team.

Two years later, at the 2007 EuroBasket, Spanoulis was again part of Greece's team. Greece played the tournament shorthanded, as it was without key players, Antonis Fotsis and Sofoklis Schortsanitis, and was not able to medal in the tournament. Greece finished in 4th place in the tournament, losing in the semifinals game against the Spain basketball team, and its numerous star players, like Marc Gasol, Juan Carlos Navarro, José Calderón, Sergio Rodríguez, Jorge Garbajosa, Rudy Fernández, and Pau Gasol. Spanoulis was the game's leading scorer, with 24 points, and he also dished out 5 assists, but Spain got the win, by a score of 82–77, over the depleted Greek squad. Spanoulis led the Greek team in scoring during the tournament, with a scoring average of 11.7 points per game.

At the 2009 EuroBasket, Spanoulis led Greece in scoring, with an average of 14.1 points per game, and led Greece to the bronze medal. He was named to the All-Tournament Team. At the 2013 EuroBasket, despite playing most of the tournament with a severe ankle injury, Spanoulis led Greece in scoring, and was third overall in the tournament in scoring, averaging 16.7 points per game. During the tournament, he led Greece with a 20-point scoring performance, to a 79–75 victory over the world's 2nd ranked team in the FIBA World Rankings at the time, Spain. At the 2015 EuroBasket, Spanoulis led the Greek team, which had four players on it who had spent the 2014–15 season in the NBA (Giannis Antetokounmpo, Kosta Koufos, Nick Calathes, and Kostas Papanikolaou) in points per game and assists per game. Greece was ultimately defeated in the quarterfinals by Spain, by a score of 73–71, and finished the tournament in 5th place. After the tournament, Spanoulis announced his retirement from the Greek senior national team. He was Greece's leading scorer in every major FIBA tournament that he played in, from 2006 onward.

FIBA World Cup
Spanoulis was a member of the Greek senior team that competed at the 2006 FIBA World Cup, and he helped to lead the Greek team to the silver medal, as they finished in second place in the tournament. In the semifinals game against Team USA, he was the game's second-leading scorer, with 22 points (after Carmelo Anthony, who scored 27 for the USA), and along with his teammate, Theo Papaloukas, led Greece to victory over the USA, by a score of 101–95.
Spanoulis led the Greece national team in scoring during the 2006 FIBA World Cup, with an average of 11.7 points per game, and he also led the Greek team in free throw shooting percentage at 87.8 percent.

Spanoulis also played with Greece at the 2010 FIBA World Cup, where he averaged 13.7 points per game, which made him Greece's leading scorer in the tournament.

Coaching career
After he retired from playing professional club basketball, Spanoulis began a new career, working as a basketball coach. He began his coaching career, working as the head coach of the Under-18 Next Generation Select Team. Spanoulis led the Under-18 Next Generation Select Team to the EuroLeague Basketball Next Generation Tournament's 2021–22 season Finals, where they lost to Mega Basket's Under-18 team, by a score of 82–61.

Peristeri Athens
On 24 June 2022, Spanoulis was officially announced as the new head coach of the Greek Basket League and FIBA Champions League club Peristeri Athens. In his first season as Peristeri's head coach, Spanoulis led the club to its first ever finals appearance in the Greek Cup competition, as they made it to the title game of the Greek Cup 2022–23. However, they lost in the finals to Olympiacos Piraeus.

Personal life
Spanoulis' older brother, Dimitris, is a former professional basketball player. Spanoulis is married to Miss Star Hellas of 2006, Olympia Chopsonidou. Together, the couple have six children: Thanasis Spanoulis (born January 2, 2010), Vassilis Spanoulis Jr. (April 5, 2012), Dimitris Spanoulis (June 5, 2013), Emilia Spanouli (August 3, 2015), Anastasia Spanouli (September 25, 2017), and another daughter (January 20, 2020).

Spanoulis' basketball idols, and favorite players as a kid, were Michael Jordan and Nikos Galis. During his playing career, Spanoulis is often referred to by the nicknames V-Span and Kill Bill. When Spanoulis played with Maroussi Athens, he was given the nickname Bill the Butcher, by Tracy Murray, who was at that time a player of Maroussi's rivals, Panathinaikos Athens.

Spanoulis was the first Greek-born player to play for the Houston Rockets, and he was the third Greek-born player to play in the NBA. While he was with the Houston Rockets, Spanoulis was friends with teammates John Lucas III, Jake Tsakalidis, Shane Battier, Tracy McGrady, and Steve Novak. Over his playing career, some of the other basketball players that he was friends with included: Mike Batiste, Tony Parker, Carlos Arroyo, Šarūnas Jasikevičius, Roderick Blakney, Nick Calathes, Ioannis Bourousis, Dimitris Diamantidis, Theo Papaloukas, Georgios Printezis, Panos Vasilopoulos, Mike James, and Dušan Vukčević, among others. While he is best friends with Nikos Zisis, and he was the best man at Zisis' wedding.

Spanoulis was one of the idols of Greek basketball player Giannis Antetokounmpo, and Slovenian basketball player Luka Dončić, when they were youths in Europe. Antetokounmpo stated the following about Spanoulis, "Do you understand who Vassilis Spanoulis is in Europe? He's like the Kobe or Jordan of Europe". Dončić said that when he was young, he was "enchanted" by Spanoulis. Dončić wore the number 7 jersey when he was a member of Real Madrid, as an homage to Spanoulis, who wore the number 7 jersey with the Greece men's national basketball team and Olympiacos Piraeus. Dončić also chose to wear the number 77 jersey with Slovenia's national team and the Dallas Mavericks, in honor of Spanoulis.

Club career statistics

EuroLeague

|-
| style="text-align:left;"| 2005–06
| style="text-align:left;" rowspan=4| Panathinaikos
| 23 || 3 || 27.8 || .534 || .368 || .780 || 2.0 || 3.1 || 1.4 || .0 || 14.6 || 15.5
|-
| style="text-align:left;"| 2007–08
| 20 || 5 || 27.8 || .444 || .355 || .750 || 2.6 || 2.7 || 1.3 || .0 || 11.3 || 11.1
|-
| style="text-align:left;background:#AFE6BA;"| 2008–09†
| 19 || 9 || 25.6 || .413 || .309 || .879 || 2.4 || 3.5 || 1.2 || .0 || 10.5 || 11.4
|-
| style="text-align:left;"| 2009–10
| 14 || 6 || 25.3 || .398 || .277 || .845 || 1.5 || 3.6 || 1.1 || .0 || 10.3 || 9.7
|-
| style="text-align:left;"| 2010–11
| style="text-align:left;" rowspan=11| Olympiacos
| 20 || 17 || 29.5 || .444 || .347 || .852 || 1.8 || 4.3 || 1.1 || .1 || 14.2 || 14.3
|-
| style="text-align:left;background:#AFE6BA;"| 2011–12†
| 21 || 19 || 29.8 || .479 || .386 || .827 || 2.0 || 4.0 || .7 || .1 || 16.7 || 16.0
|-
| style="text-align:left;background:#AFE6BA;"| 2012–13†
| 31 || 31 || 30.0 || .397 || .321 || .782 || 2.2 || 5.5 || .9 || .0 || 14.7 || 15.1
|-
| style="text-align:left;"| 2013–14
| 26 || 26 || 28.1 || .430 || .344 || .738 || 2.0 || 4.6 || .4 || .0 || 15.1 || 13.0
|-
| style="text-align:left;"| 2014–15
| 26 || 26 || 28.1 || .396 || .333 || .759 || 1.8 || 5.5 || .8 || .1 || 14.4 || 14.4
|-
| style="text-align:left;"| 2015–16
| 20 || 20 || 26.9 || .318 || .260 || .706 || 1.5 || 5.4 || .4 || .0 || 11.2 || 8.6
|-
| style="text-align:left;"| 2016–17
| 33 || 32 || 26.8 || .396 || .315 || .759 || 1.7 || 6.1 || .6 || .0 || 12.6 || 11.9
|-
| style="text-align:left;"| 2017–18
| 24 || 24 || 26.3 || .396 || .315 || .817 || 1.5 || 5.6 || .7 || .0 || 14.0 || 11.9
|-
| style="text-align:left;"| 2018–19
| 25 || 14 || 22.1 || .382 || .331 || .712 || 1.8 || 5.1 || .4 || .0 || 10.2 || 9.0
|-
| style="text-align:left;"| 2019–20
| 22 || 20 || 24.6 || .410 || .286 || .807 || 1.2 || 4.6 || .4 || .0 || 11.3 || 9.7
|-
| style="text-align:left;"| 2020–21
| 34 || 2 || 17.3 || .458 || .283 || .644 || 1.5 || 2.7 || .6 || .0 || 6.4 || 4.7
|- class="sortbottom"
| style="text-align:left;" colspan=2| Career
| 358 || 254 || 26.2 || .412 || .321 || .779 || 1.8 || 4.5|| .8 || .0 || 12.4 || 11.7

NBA

Regular season

|-
| style="text-align:left;"| 
| style="text-align:left;"| Houston
| 31 || 0 || 8.8 || .319 || .172 || .810 || .7 || .9 || .2 || .0 || 2.7
|- class="sortbottom"
| style="text-align:left;"| Career
| style="text-align:left;"|
| 31 || 0 || 8.8 || .319 || .172 || .810 || .7 || .9 || .2 || .0 || 2.7

Playoffs

|-
| style="text-align:left;"| 2007
| style="text-align:left;"| Houston
| 1 || 0 || 3.0 || .500 || .000 || 1.000 || 1.0 || 1.0 || .0 || .0 || 4.0
|- class="sortbottom"
| style="text-align:left;"| Career
| style="text-align:left;"|
| 1 || 0 || 3.0 || .500 || .000 || 1.000 || 1.0 || 1.0 || .0 || .0 || 4.0

Greece national team career statistics

|-
| style="text-align:left;background:#C0C0C0;;"| 2000
| style="text-align:left;"| World Under-18
| style="text-align:left;" rowspan=2| Greece Under-18
| 7 || N/A || – || – || – || – || – || – || – || – || 14.0
|-
| style="text-align:left;background:#CD7F32;;"| 2000
| style="text-align:left;"| Europe Under-18
| 8 || N/A || 25.9 || .579 || .286 || .786 || 1.1 || 1.9 || .5 || .0 || 10.1
|-
| style="text-align:left;"| 2002
| style="text-align:left;"| Europe Under-20Qualifying
| style="text-align:left;" rowspan=2| Greece Under-20
| 5 || N/A || 29.2 || .545 || .304 || .533 || 3.4 || 4.4 || 1.4 || .0 || 15.0
|-
| style="text-align:left;background:#FFD700;"| 2002
| style="text-align:left;"| Europe Under-20
| 8 || N/A || 31.3 || .467 || .477 || .875 || 3.1 || 5.5 || .9 || .0 || 16.0
|- class="sortbottom"
| style="text-align:center;" colspan=3| Career
| 28 || N/A || 28.7 || .520 || .395 || .755 || 2.5 || 3.9 || .9 || .0 || 13.7

|-
| style="text-align:left;background:#C0C0C0;"| 2001
| style="text-align:left;"| Mediterranean Games
| style="text-align:left;" rowspan=13| Greece Men
| 4 || – || – || – || – || – || – || – || – || – || 8.0
|-
| style="text-align:left;"| 2004
| style="text-align:left;"| Summer Olympics
| 6 || N/A || 11.0 || .444 || .500 || .750 || 0.7 || 1.0 || .3 || .0 || 3.8
|-
| style="text-align:left;background:#FFD700;"| 2005
| style="text-align:left;"| EuroBasket
| 7 || 0 || 10.3 || .227 || .100 || .600 || 1.1 || 0.3 || .3 || .0 || 2.4
|-
| style="text-align:left;background:#FFD700;"| 2006
| style="text-align:left;"| Stanković World Cup
| 3 || N/A || 23.0 || .429 || .444 || .706 || 2.7 || 1.7 || 2.3 || .0 || 9.3
|-
| style="text-align:left;background:#C0C0C0;"| 2006
| style="text-align:left;"| World Cup
| 9 || N/A || 27.2 || .358 || .262 || .878 || 1.8 || 1.3 || 1.2 || .0 || 11.7
|-
| style="text-align:left;"| 2007
| style="text-align:left;"| EuroBasket
| 9 || 0 || 26.1 || .418 || .303 || .576 || 1.8 || 2.0 || 1.1 || .0 || 11.7
|-
| style="text-align:left;background:#FFD700;"| 2008
| style="text-align:left;"| World OQT
| 4 || N/A || 24.0 || .474 || .400 || .900 || 2.5 || 3.8 || 2.8 || .0 || 12.8
|-
| style="text-align:left;"| 2008
| style="text-align:left;"| Summer Olympics
| 6 || N/A || 28.2 || .531 || .273 || .632 || 3.0 || 3.0 || 1.3 || .0 || 14.3
|-
| style="text-align:left;background:#CD7F32;"| 2009
| style="text-align:left;"| EuroBasket
| 9 || 8 || 31.3 || .458 || .436 || .829 || 2.7 || 4.2 || 1.4 || .1 || 14.1
|-
| style="text-align:left;"| 2010
| style="text-align:left;"| World Cup
| 6 || 6 || 29.3 || .520 || .419 || .810 || 1.0 || 2.3 || 1.2 || .0 || 13.7
|-
| style="text-align:left;"| 2012
| style="text-align:left;"| World OQT
| 3 || 2 || 26.3 || .613 || .500 || .619 || 2.7 || 5.7 || 0.3 || .0 || 19.3
|-
| style="text-align:left;"| 2013
| style="text-align:left;"| EuroBasket
| 6 || 6 || 30.2 || .439 || .303 || .780 || 3.3 || 2.5 || 0.7 || .2 || 16.7
|-
| style="text-align:left;"| 2015
| style="text-align:left;"| EuroBasket
| 7 || 7 || 27.6 || .411 || .385 || .727 || 2.3 || 5.3 || 0.3 || .1 || 11.4
|- class="sortbottom"
| style="text-align:center;" colspan=3| Career
| 79 || N/A || 24.9 || .445 || .351 || .746 || 2.1 || 2.6 || 1.1 || .0 || 11.3

Awards and accomplishments

Youth club career
Panhellenic Youth Championship Champion: 1999
Panhellenic Youth Championship Top Scorer: 1999
Panhellenic Youth Championship MVP: 1999

Pro club career
 3× EuroLeague champion: 2009, 2012, 2013
 Panathinaikos: 2009
 2× Olympiacos: 2012, 2013
 2× EuroLeague Runner-up: 2015, 2017
 2× Olympiacos: 2015, 2017
 7× Greek League champion: 2006, 2008, 2009, 2010, 2012, 2015, 2016
 4× Panathinaikos: 2006, 2008, 2009, 2010
 3× Olympiacos: 2012, 2015, 2016
 4× Greek Cup winner: 2006, 2008, 2009, 2011
 3× Panathinaikos: 2006, 2008, 2009
 Olympiacos: 2011
 6× Greek League Runner-up: 2004, 2011, 2013, 2014, 2017, 2018
 Maroussi: 2004
 5× Olympiacos: 2011, 2013, 2014, 2017, 2018
 5× Greek Cup Runner-up: 2002, 2010, 2012, 2013, 2018
 Maroussi: 2002
 Panathinaikos: 2010
 3× Olympiacos: 2012, 2013, 2018
 Triple Crown winner: 2009
 Panathinaikos: 2009
 FIBA Intercontinental Cup champion: 2013
 Olympiacos: 2013
 FIBA Europe League Runner-up: 2004
 Maroussi: 2004

Greek junior national team
 2000 FIBA Europe Under-18 Championship: 
 2000 Albert Schweitzer Under-18 World Tournament: 
 2002 FIBA Europe Under-20 Championship:

Greek senior national team
 2001 Mediterranean Games: 
 9× Acropolis Tournament champion: (2004, 2005, 2006, 2007, 2008, 2009, 2010, 2013, 2015)
 2005 EuroBasket: 
 2006 FIBA Stanković World Cup: 
 2006 FIBA World Cup: 
 2008 FIBA World OQT: 
 2009 EuroBasket:

Individual
Olympiacos 2010–20 Team of Decade
 EuroLeague MVP: 2013
 3× EuroLeague Final Four MVP: 2009, 2012, 2013
 EuroLeague Finals Top Scorer: 2013
 3× EuroLeague MVP of the Month: 
 February 2012, November 2012, October 2014
 8× EuroLeague MVP of the Round: 
 2006 (2× – Regular Season Round 2 and Playoffs Games 1 and 2), 2014 (2× – Regular Season Round 8 and Top 16 Round 1), 2017 (2× - Regular Season Round 2 and Playoffs Game 5), 2018 (Regular Season Round 23), 2019 (Regular Season Round 14)
 8× All-EuroLeague Team: 2006, 2009, 2011, 2012, 2013, 2014, 2015, 2018
 3× All-EuroLeague Team First Team: 2012, 2013, 2015
 5× All-EuroLeague Team Second Team: 2006, 2009, 2011, 2014, 2018
 EuroLeague's Best Captain: 2018
 FIBA Intercontinental Cup MVP: 2013
 Giuseppe Sciacca International Award for Sport (Vatican's World Athlete of the Year): 2013
 2× All-Europe Player of the Year: 2012, 2013
 Balkan Athlete of the Year: 2009
 EuroBasket All-Tournament Team: 2009
 2× Acropolis Tournament MVP: 2007, 2009
 3× Greek League MVP: 2009, 2012, 2016
 3× Greek League Finals MVP: 2012, 2015, 2016
 2× Greek League Most Popular Player: 2015, 2017
 Greek League Best Young Player: 2003
 Greek League Most Improved Player: 2004
 10× Greek League All-Star Game: 2005, 2006, 2008, 2009, 2010, 2011, 2013, 2014, 2018, 2019
 10× All-Greek League Team: 2005, 2006, 2008, 2009, 2011, 2012, 2013, 2015, 2016, 2017
EuroBasket All-Tournament Team: (2009)
 12× Eurobasket.com's All-Greek League Domestic Team: 2005, 2006, 2008, 2009, 2011, 2012, 2013, 2014, 2015, 2016, 2017, 2018
 Greek Cup Finals Top Scorer: 2018
 4× Greek League assists leader: 2005, 2008, 2012, 2013
 Named the Most Clutch Player in EuroLeague History by Euroleague.net: 2017
 Named one of the Summer Olympic Games' Top 25 Men's Players since 1992 (since NBA players could play at the Olympics): 2020
 Voted one of the Greece men's national basketball team Best 5 Players of the FIBA EuroBasket's 2000–2020 era: 2020
 Voted one of FIBA EuroBasket's Best 5 Players overall of the 2000–2020 era: 2020 
 Voted the Best EuroLeague Player of The 2010s Decade by Eurohoops.net: 2020
 EuroLeague 2010–20 All-Decade Team (2020)
 EuroLeague 2010–20 Player of the Decade: 2020
 HoopsHype's 75 Greatest International Players Ever: (2021)
 EuroLeague Basketball Legend: 2022
 Greek Basket League Hall of Fame: 2022
 #1 All-time in career total points scored in Professional Greek League
 #1 All-time in career assists in Professional Greek League
 #2 All-time in career 3 pointers made in Professional Greek League
 #1 All-time in career total points scored in EuroLeague

Olympiacos B.C. records
All-Time Top Scorer in EuroLeague
All-Time Assists Leader in EuroLeague

References

External links

Player:
 Vassilis Spanoulis @ Agonasport
 Vassilis Spanoulis @ Hellenic Basketball Federation 
 Vassilis Spanoulis @ BasketNews
 Vassilis Spanoulis @ EOKBasket 
 
 Vassilis Spanoulis @ EuroLeague
 Vassilis Spanoulis @ ΕSΑΚΕ 
 
 Vassilis Spanoulis @ FIBA Europe
 Vassilis Spanoulis @ G-Sports.gr
 Vassilis Spanoulis @ ESAKE Hall of Fame 
 Vassilis Spanoulis @ NBA
 Vassilis Spanoulis @ ProBallers

Coach:
 Vassilis Spanoulis @ Eurobasket.com
 Vassilis Spanoulis @ Peristeri Athens 

1982 births
Living people
2006 FIBA World Championship players
2010 FIBA World Championship players
Basketball players at the 2004 Summer Olympics
Basketball players at the 2008 Summer Olympics
Basketball players from Larissa
Competitors at the 2001 Mediterranean Games
Dallas Mavericks draft picks
FIBA EuroBasket-winning players
Greek basketball coaches
Greek Basket League players
Greek expatriate basketball people in the United States
Greek men's basketball players
Gymnastikos S. Larissas B.C. players
Houston Rockets players
Maroussi B.C. players
Mediterranean Games medalists in basketball
Mediterranean Games silver medalists for Greece
National Basketball Association players from Greece
Olympiacos B.C. players
Olympic basketball players of Greece
Panathinaikos B.C. players
Peristeri B.C. coaches
Point guards
Shooting guards